Stimela is a South African Afro-fusion band, founded during the 1970s by Ray Phiri, a self-taught guitarist. The band was formed when Phiri got together with drummer Isaac Mtshali, Thabo Lloyd Lelosa and Jabu Sibumbe, and they initially called themselves the Cannibals. The band started out as instrumentalists, but it later evolved to Afro-fusion when they joined forces with vocalist Jacob "Mparanyana" Radebe in 1975, continuing to work together for four years. The band kept going after Radebe died in 1978.

They changed their name to Stimela after a life-changing experience in Mozambique when they were stranded in Maputo for three months. They had to sell all their belongings to take a train home. This trip was a watershed moment as it was where they conceived the new name for the band: train is translated as Stimela in Nguni languages.

Besides the change in name, the band also expanded with new members Charlie "Sam" Ndlovu, Nana Coyote, Thapelo Kgomo and Ntokozo Zungu. With soulful tunes and gripping lyrics, the band has recorded platinum-winning albums such as Fire, Passion and Ecstasy, Listen, Look and Decide as well as the controversial People Don't Talk, So Let's Talk. One of their most memorable tracks — "Whispers in the Deep" — was restricted for broadcast by the old South African Broadcasting Corporation.

Members
Ray Phiri (1947–2017) - lead guitar, lead vocals
Sam Ndlovu - Vocals
Isaac "Mnca" Mtshali (1955–2019) - drummer
Nana Coyote (1955–2010) - lead vocals
Thapelo Khomo - Keyboards/Piano/Synthesizers 
Ntokozo Zungu - lead guitar
Bafana Khuzwayo (1978-2017) - organ
Lloyd Lelosa (1955-2021) - Keyboards/Piano
Jabu Sibumbe - Bass
Sandile Ngema - Bass
Charles "Dibabas" Ndlovu (***-2009) - Organ
Sizwe Mashinini - Keyboards

Discography
 1982: Mama Wami 
 1982: The Cannibals 
 1983: I Hate Telling A Lie /I Love You 
 1984: Fire, Passion and Ecstasy
 1985: Shadows, Fear and Pain
 1986: Look, Listen and Decide
 1986: Rewind (EP) 
 1987: The Unfinished Story 
 1988: Live!
 1989: Trouble In The Land of Plenty 
 1990: The 2nd Half 
 1991: Siyaya
 1992: Khululani 
 1993: Are You Ready (Live Album)
 1994: Don't Ask Why 
 1995: Are You Ready (Live)
 1996: Out of the Ashes
 2000: Steam Tracks (Best of)
 2001: Live At The Market Theatre - 1st Half (Stimela 1988 Live Re-Release )
 2002: The 2nd Half (Re-release) 
 2010: A Lifetime...
 2011: Turn on the Sun 
 2018: Catch The Train

References 

South African musical groups
Musical groups established in 1982
1982 establishments in South Africa